Alex Goyette (born October 5, 1988) is an American film director, writer, producer, actor, and YouTube personality. He is the writer/director of Expelled, a comedy which ranked #1 worldwide on iTunes during its December 2014 release. Goyette studied film at Cal State Northridge, and created his sketch comedy YouTube channel on April 17, 2011. The channel's videos have been viewed 13 million times.

Background
Goyette was born on October 5, 1988 to a French father and a Japanese mother. Goyette lived on Mercer Island, Washington for the majority of his young life. Goyette began creating films and videos at the age of eleven, when he first created a parody of Saving Private Ryan. At the age of 15 he wrote his first feature film "The Safe" and began shooting it during his sophomore year of high school.

In 2007, Goyette moved to California to pursue his dream and career in filmmaking. Goyette attended Orange Coast College before transferring to Cal State Northridge where he studied from 2009 to 2012 and earned his Bachelor of Arts degree in Cinematography and Film/Video Production.

Goyette is agnostic.

YouTube
Goyette created his channel, JouleTheif, on April 17, 2011. Goyette would upload several viral videos on the channel. The videos would accumulate 5.3 million views by July 25, 2013. Goyette also influenced Matthew Fredrick, also known as Matthias, and winner of the second season of Internet Icon, to join YouTube. The two would go on to frequently collaborate with each other, and both went on to be part of the AwesomenessTV Network.

AwesomenessTV
While on YouTube, Goyette would appear on and work with AwesomenessTV, a YouTube channel funded by YouTube's original channel program. On his channel, Goyette directed, produced, wrote, and starred in a fake trailer centered around the Waldo character. Goyette's video Waldo The Movie -Trailer Parody [HD] gave him the opportunity to have a pitch meeting with Brian Robbins and Joe Davola of AwesomenessTV. The most viewed video he appeared in featured him dress up as an Apple Store employee, and drop boxes filled with items, in front of people waiting outside an Apple Store on the release day of the iPhone 5, giving the illusion that Goyette had broken several iPhones. The video would go on to earn over 5.7 million views and be covered by Today. Goyette has worked on other videos with Awesomeness, and has uploaded other prank videos as well. Goyette directed and wrote a series, Expelled, for the network, starring Nathan Kress and Teala Dunn, as part of AwesomenessTV's plan to introduce new series under DreamWorks Animation.

Internet Icon
In 2013, Goyette used his fake Waldo trailer video as a submission video for the second season of the YOMYOMF web series, Internet Icon. The video earned him a spot in the top 10 of the competition. He was eliminated after being accused by Ryan Higa of copying an idea for "Amy's Will", although he claimed to never have seen the video. Goyette placed fifth in the competition.

Overview of Internet Icon

References

1988 births
American agnostics
American directors
American people of Canadian descent
American people of Japanese descent
American YouTubers
Businesspeople from Los Angeles
California State University, Northridge alumni
Film producers from California
Internet Icon
Living people
Mercer Island High School alumni
Orange Coast College alumni
Place of birth missing (living people)